The Municipality of Hrpelje-Kozina is a municipality in the Littoral region of Slovenia. Its seat is the village of Hrpelje.

A major border crossing to Italy is located in the municipality at the village of Krvavi Potok. It connects to Pese di Grozzana in the Municipality of San Dorligo della Valle near Trieste on the Italian side.

Settlements
In addition to the municipal seat of Hrpelje, the municipality also includes the following settlements:

 Artviže
 Bač pri Materiji
 Beka
 Brezovica
 Brezovo Brdo
 Golac
 Gradišče pri Materiji
 Gradišica
 Hotična
 Javorje
 Klanec pri Kozini
 Kovčice
 Kozina
 Krvavi Potok
 Markovščina
 Materija
 Mihele
 Mrše
 Nasirec
 Obrov
 Ocizla
 Odolina
 Orehek pri Materiji
 Ostrovica
 Petrinje
 Poljane pri Podgradu
 Povžane
 Prešnica
 Ritomeče
 Rodik
 Rožice
 Skadanščina
 Slivje
 Slope
 Tatre
 Tublje pri Hrpeljah
 Velike Loče
 Vrhpolje

References

External links

Municipality of Hrpelje-Kozina on Geopedia

 
Hrpelje-Kozina
1994 establishments in Slovenia